Peroxyureidoacrylate/ureidoacrylate amidohydrolase (RutB) is an enzyme with systematic name (Z)-3-ureidoacrylate peracid amidohydrolase. This enzyme catalyses the following chemical reaction sequences:

 (Z)-3-ureidoacrylate peracid + H2O ⇌ (Z)-3-peroxyaminoacrylate + CO2 + NH3 (overall reaction)
 (Z)-3-ureidoacrylate peracid + H2O ⇌ (Z)-3-peroxyaminoacrylate + carbamate
 carbamate ⇌ CO2 + NH3 (spontaneous)
 (Z)-2-methylureidoacrylate peracid + H2O ⇌ (Z)-2-methylperoxyaminoacrylate + CO2 + NH3 (overall reaction)
 (Z)-2-methylureidoacrylate peracid + H2O ⇌ (Z)-2-methylperoxyaminoacrylate + carbamate
 carbamate ⇌ CO2 + NH3 (spontaneous)

The enzyme also shows activity towards ureidoacrylate.

References

External links 
 

EC 3.5.1